Harvest Country Music Festival was a country music festival which took place for the first time on Saturday 26th and Sunday 27 August 2017, organised and promoted by Aiken Promotions.

Aiken Promotions announced the new festival in December 2016. along with headline acts Miranda Lambert and Nathan Carter. Shortly after the announcement, additional camping facilities were added due to demand

The event was held simultaneously at two locations, sharing the same line-up with artists performing at one location on Saturday and then swapping on Sunday. The locations were Westport House in Westport, County Mayo, Republic of Ireland, and St. Angelo Airport at Trory, just outside Enniskillen, in County Fermanagh, Northern Ireland.

St. Angelo Airport predicted crowd numbers of 15,000 for the weekend and tickets were available on the day at both venues

2017 Line up

Headliners 

Miranda Lambert included Harvest Festival in the European leg of her Highway Vagabond Tour - the only dates in Ireland and Northern Ireland.

Nathan Carter was the headliner for the other night of the festival.

Charlie Pride was added as a 'very special guest' in April 2017

Other Acts 

The festival featured a range of Country Music artists from Ireland, the UK and America.

The Shires had been due to play however were forced to cancel at short notice due to illness. Logan Brill was moved up the running order to fill their time slot.

Full line up & stage times 

Stage Times were publicised via the website and Twitter on 22 August

See also
List of country music festivals
List of folk festivals

References 

Country music festivals in Europe
Music festivals in Ireland